Daniel Weld may refer to:

 Daniel Weld (Weld family), colonial Boston teacher
 Daniel S. Weld, American computer scientist